Love O2O is a 2016 Chinese romance film directed by Zhao Tianyu and starring Angelababy and Jing Boran. It is based on the novel of the same name by Gu Man. It was released in China on August 12, 2016.

Plot
Xiao Nai is a gaming expert, who is also the most popular student on campus. One day, he comes across the campus goddess Bei Wei Wei and it was love at first sight. However, it was not Wei Wei's looks that he noticed, but her skill mastery of the online role-playing game that they both play. Now, Xiao Nai must use his skills both in real life and online to capture Wei Wei's heart. But does their love have the experience points to succeed, or will this relationship never Level Up to the next stage?

Cast

Reception
The film grossed  on its opening weekend in China.

See also 
 Love O2O (TV series)

References

Chinese romantic comedy films
2016 romantic comedy films
Films based on Chinese novels
Films scored by Nathan Wang
Chinese teen films
Tencent Pictures films
Love O2O